Poklonovsky is a rural locality (a khutor) and the administrative center of Poklonovskoye Rural Settlement, Alexeyevsky District, Volgograd Oblast, Russia. The population was 406 as of 2010.

Geography 
Poklonovsky is located 20 km north of Alexeyevskaya (the district's administrative centre) by road. Pavlovsky is the nearest rural locality.

References 

Rural localities in Alexeyevsky District, Volgograd Oblast